One Beer may refer to:

"One Beer" (Hardy song), 2020
"One Beer" (Madvillain song), recorded by MF Doom in 2004
"One Beer" (Tiny Toon Adventures), banned animated television series episode segment

See also